Pharagos: The Battleground was a proposed campaign setting for the Dungeons & Dragons role-playing game, written by James Wyatt. Though the setting was never expanded and published into a fully detailed setting, it did make an appearance as a three-part feature in Dragon, Dungeon, and Polyhedron magazines.

Forerunners 
In the Incursion d20 minigame, "forerunner" is the term used to refer to the human ancestors from which the githyanki and the githzerai are descended, before their race was enslaved and altered by the illithids. In ages past on the planet Pharagos, they had an advanced and peaceful civilization, but the invasion of the illithids led to the enslavement of the entire race. Only a few indescribably ancient ruins of their civilization remain on Pharagos, with little evidence of the nature of their culture.

A small remnant of the all but extinct forerunner rootstock—the descendants of thralls that never managed to escape from slavery—still dwell on Penumbra, the abandoned artificial world created as a capital by the illithids at the height of their vast empire. They are all that remains of their race from before the rebellion led by Gith. Having reverted to barbarism after the fall of the illithid empire, they retain little knowledge of their own past. Pharagos, the original home planet of the forerunners, has little evidence of them ever having been there aside from a few ruins, and the planet's current inhabitants know nothing of their world's past role in the history of the gith races or the illithid empire.

Planet of Pharagos 
In the Incursion d20 minigame, Pharagos is described as the lost homeworld of the Forerunners.

Pharagos is a lightly populated Earth-like world with three continents and numerous chains of islands. The one remarkable feature of this world is the presence of an immense petrified corpse of a god previously worshiped by the Forerunner civilization before it was crushed by the illithid empire. A vast stony column of forgotten beliefs, it is buried deep in the ground. The current inhabitants of Pharagos have no knowledge of the planet's past; the illithid empire's rule over Pharagos and the origin of the gith races on this world are lost to history. They are unaware that the source of mystical power for their numerous cults comes from the presence of the dead god under their land.

References 

 Perkins, Christopher (July 2003). "The Lich-Queen's Beloved." Dungeon Magazine, p. 96.
 Wyatt, James (July 2003). "Knights of the Lich-Queen." Polyhedron Magazine, p. 5.

Dungeons & Dragons campaign settings
Fantasy worlds